The 2012–13 Bangladesh Premier league  is also known as Grameenphone Bangladesh Premier League due to the sponsorship from Grameenphone. It was the 6th edition of the Bangladesh Premier League. The league started on 13 November 2012 and finished on 8 May 2013.

Nine teams competed with each other on a home and away basis with Sheikh Russell claiming their first Bangladesh Premier League championship and qualification to the 2014 AFC President's Cup. While Arambagh suffered relegation.

2012–13 Bangladesh Premier League teams and locations

Rahmatganj MFS and Farashganj SC, both representing the city of Dhaka were relegated last season. No teams appeared to replace them so the league would feature only nine sides.

Standings

League table

Season statistics

Goalscorers

Own goals 
† Bold Club indicates winner of the match

Hat-tricks

References

Bangladesh Football Premier League seasons
Bangladesh
1
1